Gnathothlibus saccoi is a moth of the  family Sphingidae. It is known from Vanuatu.

The length of the forewings is 42–49 mm for males and 52–57 mm for females. It is similar to but differs from Gnathothlibus erotus in its larger size and broader wings with prominent markings. The antennae are creamy brown above and dark brown below. The head, thorax and abdomen are uniformly greenish brown dorsally. There is a thin creamy-brown lateral stripe running from the base of the antenna to the posterior of the thorax. Ventrally, the thorax is reddish brown laterally, with median creamy-brown band. The abdominal segments are greenish brown but reddish brown laterally. The abdomen has five small lateral black spots surrounded by white. The forewing upperside of the males is greenish brown with darker markings. The forewing underside is burnt orange, speckled with dark brown distally. The hindwing upperside is orange with a broad dark marginal band, which is thinnest at the apex. The forewing upperside is similar to the male but reddish brown. The hindwing upperside is also similar, but the marginal band is broader.

References

Gnathothlibus
Moths described in 2001